Variant was a free cultural magazine based in Glasgow, Scotland, and founded in 1984. Available in both print and internet editions, it was distributed mainly though arts and cultural institutions through Britain and Ireland. Although nominally an arts and cultural bulletin, the magazine also dealt with broader social and political issues, often from a left-leaning perspective. 15,000 copies were distributed per issue.

Volume 1 ran from issue 1 (1984) to 16 (1994), almost twice a year; volume 2 ran from 1996 to 2012, two or three times a year. Contributors included people such as cultural theorist Angela McRobbie, artist Mark Pawson, etc.

References

External links
Variant.org.uk

Biannual magazines published in the United Kingdom
Cultural magazines published in the United Kingdom
Triannual magazines published in the United Kingdom
Defunct political magazines published in the United Kingdom
Defunct magazines published in Scotland
Far-left politics in Scotland
Free magazines
Magazines established in 1984
Magazines disestablished in 2012
Mass media in Glasgow